Cammy MacGregor (born October 11, 1968) is an American former tennis player from the mid-1980s until 1995.

Her elder sister Cynthia was also a tennis player, and they sometimes partnered in doubles.

WTA Tour finals

Singles (1 runner-up)

Doubles 10 (3 titles – 7 runners-up)

External links

 
 

American female tennis players
1968 births
Living people
21st-century American women
Tennis people from California